Robin Raina (born August 31, 1967) is an Indian-born American industrial engineer, businessman and philanthropist who is the chairman, president and chief executive officer of Ebix Group and the founder of Robin Raina Foundation.

Raina joined Delphi Information Systems, Inc. in 1997 as Vice President of Professional Services.  In August 1999 he was promoted to the added title of President, having previously been named COO.  In 1999 Delphi changed its name to Ebix.com and then in 2003 changed its name to Ebix Inc.

Early life and education 
Raina was born to a Kashmiri Pandit family in Srinagar on 31 August 1967. He moved to Patiala, Punjab at the age of five and pursued most of his early education from Our Lady of Fatima Convent High School. He graduated from Thapar Institute of Engineering and Technology with a degree in industrial engineering in 1989. He joined Pertech Computers Limited and was promoted as area manager in 1990. He left for Singapore in 1993 after joining Mindware.

References

External links
 Ebix Ranked No.4: 100 Fastest Growing Companies in the world -Fortune
 Robin Raina: The richest executives - CNNMoney
 Robin ranked No.1 CEO in Georgia for two consecutive years - Atlanta Business Chronicle
 Robin Raina: Executive Profile & Biography – BusinessWeek
 Forbes Profile of Robin Raina
 Digitizing the Insurance industry - Fox News
 Ebix CEO Robin Raina Receives Multiple Awards Including Being Named the Top Performing CEO In Georgia by Atlanta Business Chronicle
 The top-performing CEO, Number 1 Robin Raina, Ebix Inc
 Entrepreneur of the Year Robin Raina, CEO of Ebix, Inc
 Ebix CEO lauded for philanthropy
 Robin Raina Profile - Forbes.com
 2009 FSB 100: Top Small Businesses - Ebix Inc

American computer businesspeople
Businesspeople in software
1967 births
Living people